Jacob A. Abraham is an American computer scientist and engineer who is currently the Cockrell Family Regents Chair in the Department of Electrical and Computer Engineering at the University of Texas at Austin. He is a member of the Institute of Electrical and Electronics Engineers and the Association for Computing Machinery.

Early life and education

He received a bachelor's degree in electrical engineering from the University of Kerala in 1970. He received an M.S. degree, also in electrical engineering, and Ph.D., in electrical engineering and computer science, from Stanford University.

Awards and recognition

Abraham is a recipient of numerous awards including the IEEE Emanuel R. Piore Award, the Jean-Claude Laprie Award, and the IEEE TTTC Lifetime Contribution Medal. He also was a fellow of both IEEE and ACM.

References

External links

Year of birth missing (living people)
Living people
American computer scientists
Indian computer scientists
Stanford University School of Engineering alumni
University of Kerala alumni
University of Illinois faculty
University of Texas at Austin faculty
Fellows of the Association for Computing Machinery
Fellow Members of the IEEE